Wojciech is a Polish name, equivalent to Czech Vojtěch , Slovak Vojtech, and German Woitke. The name is formed from two Slavic roots:
 wój (Slavic: voj), a root pertaining to war. It also forms words like wojownik ("warrior") and wojna ("war").
 ciech (from an earlier form, tech), meaning "joy".
The resulting combination means "he who enjoys war" or "joyous warrior".

Its Polish diminutive forms include Wojtek , Wojtuś , Wojtas, Wojcio, Wojteczek, Wojcieszek, Wojtaszka, Wojtaszek, Wojan (noted already in 1136), Wojko, and variants noted as early as 1400, including Woytko, Woythko, and Voytko. The feminine form is Wojciecha. Related names in South Slavic languages include Vojko, Vojislav, and Vojteh.

The name has been rendered into German in several different variations, including: Woitke, Witke, Voitke, Voytke, Woytke, Vogtke, Woytegk, Woytek, Wogtke, Woetke, Wötke, and Wotke. It appears as Woyzeck in the play of that name by Georg Büchner.

The Germanic name Adalbert is sometimes associated with Wojciech, or Vojtech, but the two names are not linguistically related. Their components and meanings are completely different, but the names may have become associated as a result of the 10th-century St. Adalbert of Prague (born Vojtěch Slavník) having taken the name Adalbert at his confirmation.

The name day for individuals named Wojciech is 23 April.

People and characters with the given name Wojciech 
 Saint Adalbert of Prague (Czech: svatý Vojtěch; Polish: Św. Wojciech), the first recorded user of this name
 Wojciech Bogusławski, a Polish actor, theatre director, and writer of dramas
 Wojciech Bobowski, an Ottoman musician, dragoman, and an intellectual of Polish descent.
 Wojciech Buliński, Polish architect and professor
 Wojciech Fibak, Polish tennis player
 Wojciech Frykowski, Polish actor, murdered in the US in 1969
 Wojciech Jaruzelski, Polish political and military leader, prime minister, head of the Polish Council of State, President and de facto dictator of Poland 1981–89
 Wojciech Kamiński, Polish basketball coach
 Wojciech Kasperski, Polish film director
 Wojciech Kilar, Polish composer, known especially for his film music to Dracula
 Wojciech Kondratowicz, Polish hammer thrower
 Wojciech Korfanty, a Polish activist, journalist, politician, and a leader of the Silesian uprisings
 Wojciech Kossak, Polish painter
 Wojciech Olejniczak, Polish politician
 Wojciech Pszoniak, Polish actor
 Wojciech Dorabialski, former Director of Department of Competition Protection at the Polish Competition Authority 
 Wojciech Samotij, Polish mathematician
 Wojciech Stuchlik, Polish tennis player
 Wojciech Szczęsny, Polish goalkeeper
 Wojciech Szpankowski, Polish-born American computer scientist
 Wojciech Wentura, Polish opera tenor
 Wojtek Wolski, Polish-born Canadian National Hockey League forward for the Washington Capitals
 Wojciech Zabłocki, Polish architect and fencer
 Wojciech Zurek, Polish-born physicist and nationalized American who works at Los Alamos National Laboratory in quantum physics
 Wojciech Żukrowski, Polish writer

Others
 Wojtek, a Syrian brown bear from Persia adopted by soldiers of the Polish II Corps

See also 
 Vojtěch
 Béla (given name)
 Adalbert
 Voytek
 Polish name
 Slavic names
 Wojciechów (disambiguation) – Polish place names
 Wojciechowski – Polish surname

References 

Polish masculine given names
Slavic masculine given names